The Four Great Men of Kokugaku (國學の四大人, Kokugaku no shitaijin or Kokugaku no shiushi) are a group of Edo-period Japanese scholars recognized as the most significant figures in the Kokugaku tradition of Japanese philology, religious studies, and philosophy. They are traditionally enumerated as:

Kada no Azumamaro
Kamo no Mabuchi
Motoori Norinaga
Hirata Atsutane

External links 
Japanese definition
個人的には納得できない「国学の四大人
Quartets
Japanese culture-related lists
People of Edo-period Japan